General Lejeune may refer to:

Francis St David Benwell Lejeune (1899–1984), British Army major general
John A. Lejeune (1867–1942), U.S. Marine Corps lieutenant general
Louis-François Lejeune (1775–1848), French Army general